George M. Lane (died October 9, 1901) was a professional baseball player in the Major Leagues. His debut in the Major Leagues was on May 16, 1882. He finished his baseball career on September 9, 1884. He was a first baseman and outfielder for the 1882 Pittsburgh Alleghenys of the American Association and the 1884 Toledo Blue Stockings of the Union Association. Lane died October 9, 1901 in Philadelphia.

External links

Major League Baseball first basemen
19th-century baseball players
Pittsburgh Alleghenys players
Toledo Blue Stockings players
1901 deaths
Wheeling Standard players
Springfield Champion City players
Buffalo (minor league baseball) players
Pittsburgh Allegheny players
Toledo Blue Stockings (minor league) players
Year of birth missing
Baseball players from Pittsburgh